Lleyton Andrew Tanabe Brooks (born 21 March 2001) is an Australian professional footballer who plays as a winger for Melbourne Victory.

Youth career 
Brooks was part of the 2018-19 Y-League championship winning Brisbane Roar Youth team. He replaced Shannon Brady in the 82nd minute as the Young Roar beat Western Sydney Wanderers Youth 3–1 in the 2019 Y-League Grand Final on 1 February 2019.

Club career

Melbourne Victory 
On 8 August 2020, Brooks made his professional debut in a clash with Perth Glory, replacing Luis Lawrie-Lattanzio in the 69th minute before assisting Elvis Kamsoba's 92nd-minute strike in a 4–0 win at Jubilee Oval.

In his debut season with the Victory, Brooks made 9 appearances and scored 2 goals; his performances saw him awarded with Melbourne Victory's Young Player of the Season award.

Honours

Club
Brisbane Roar
Y-League: 2018–19

International
Australia U20
AFF U-19 Youth Championship: 2019

References

External links 

2001 births
Living people
Australian soccer players
Association football forwards
Melbourne Victory FC players
Brisbane Roar FC players
Brisbane Strikers FC players